Orfeas Xanthi Football Club is a Greek football club based in Xanthi, Greece.

Honours

National
 Fourth Tier Champions: 1
 2020–21

Domestic
 Xanthi FCA Champions: 7
 1992–93, 1996–97, 2000–01, 2001–02, 2003–04, 2012–13, 2015–16
 Xanthi FCA Cup Winners: 8
 1985–86, 1997–98, 1998–99, 2002–03, 2003–04, 2006–07, 2009–10, 2011–12

Football clubs in Central Macedonia
Thessaloniki (regional unit)
Association football clubs established in 1903
1903 establishments in Greece
Gamma Ethniki clubs